Medicine Lake is an independent municipality in Hennepin County, Minnesota, United States located on a peninsula that juts into a lake of the same name. The population was 371 at the 2010 census.

History
"Medicine Lake Park" was developed as part of Plymouth, Minnesota by Jacob Barge around 1887. He sold lots to "city folks" to build cabins to get away from the "hustle and bustle" of city life. The City of Medicine Lake became an independent municipality in 1944. That year, residents voted to separate from Plymouth, Minnesota, even though Plymouth surrounds the city geographically. The move toward separation was spearheaded by Mr. Les Johantgen, Mr. Charles Brudigan and Mr. Ernest Ertl, among others. Residents held a meeting on April 14, 1944, to discuss separation from Plymouth. The first referendum on this separation was duly recorded on April 24th of the same year.

Geography
The city is completely surrounded by the city of Plymouth, and forms a peninsula stretching into the lake that it is named after. The 45th Parallel (North) passes directly through the City of Medicine Lake, as well as through Medicine Lake.  

Minnesota State Highway 55 is 0.5 mile from the community.

Demographics

2010 census
As of the census of 2010, there were 371 people, 160 households, and 104 families residing in the city. The racial makeup of the city was 89.8% White, 4.3% African American, 1.3% Native American, 2.2% Asian, and 2.4% from two or more races. Hispanic or Latino of any race were 1.3% of the population.

There were 160 households, of which 23.8% had children under the age of 18 living with them, 51.9% were married couples living together, 7.5% had a female householder with no husband present, 5.6% had a male householder with no wife present, and 35.0% were non-families. 28.1% of all households were made up of individuals, and 8.2% had someone living alone who was 65 years of age or older. The average household size was 2.32 and the average family size was 2.88.

The median age in the city was 47.7 years. 21.6% of residents were under the age of 18; 4.3% were between the ages of 18 and 24; 19.4% were from 25 to 44; 39.4% were from 45 to 64; and 15.4% were 65 years of age or older. The gender makeup of the city was 52.3% male and 47.7% female.

2000 census
As of the census of 2000, there were 368 people, 159 households, and 94 families residing in the city. The population density was 2,133.1 persons per square mile (835.8/km2). The racial makeup of the city was 95.38% White, 0.54% African American, 2.45% Asian, and 1.63% from two or more races. Hispanic or Latino of any race were 1.36% of the population. 23.9% were of German, 14.0% Norwegian, 13.7% Swedish, 6.4% Dutch, 6.1% English and 5.1% Polish ancestry.

There were 159 households, out of which 25.2% had children under the age of 18 living with them, 54.1% were married couples living together, 3.8% had a female householder with no husband present, and 40.3% were non-families. 32.7% of all households were made up of individuals, and 6.3% had someone living alone who was 65 years of age or older.  The average household size was 2.31 and the average family size was 3.02.

In the city, the population was spread out, with 20.9% under the age of 18, 6.3% from 18 to 24, 29.9% from 25 to 44, 32.3% from 45 to 64, and 10.6% who were 65 years of age or older.  The median age was 41 years. For every 100 females, there were 103.3 males.  For every 100 females age 18 and over, there were 104.9 males.

The median income for a household in the city was $70,750, and the median income for a family was $100,382. Males had a median income of $51,250 versus $37,125 for females. The per capita income for the city was $45,942.  None of the families and 1.1% of the population were living below the poverty line, including no under eighteens and none of those over 64.

Education

Public schools

Medicine Lake is part of the Wayzata Public Schools (ISD 284). Students can also attend public schools in other school districts chosen by their families under Minnesota's open enrollment statute.  Wayzata Public Schools has set attendance boundaries so that children living in the City of Medicine Lake attend the following progression of schools:  

 Sunset Hill Elementary School
 Wayzata East Middle School
 Wayzata High School

Wayzata High School is operated by the Wayzata School District, has approximately 3500 students in grades 9 to 12 (2011), making it the largest secondary school by enrollment in Minnesota. Projected enrollment for the 2012-2013 School Year is 3617. It is also the largest Minnesota secondary school by structural size, with an interior of 487,000 square feet (45,200 m2). The school is part of the Lake Conference.
In 2008, Newsweek ranked the school #940 "List of the 1300 Top High Schools in America."

Politics 
Medicine Lake is located in Minnesota's 3rd congressional district, represented in the U.S. House of Representatives by Dean Phillips, a Democrat. After the adoption of Minnesota's 2012 redistricting, the city moved to MN House District 46A, represented by Representative Ryan Winkler, a Democrat, and MN Senate District 46, represented Senator Ron Latz, a Democrat.

Notable people
 Terry Gilliam – American-born British screenwriter, film director, animator, actor and member of the Monty Python comedy troupe. His family moved to Medicine Lake soon after Gilliam was born in Minneapolis in 1940.
 Lois McMaster Bujold – American speculative fiction writer.

References

External links
 City of Medicine Lake website
 

Cities in Minnesota
Cities in Hennepin County, Minnesota
Populated places established in 1887
1887 establishments in Minnesota